Little Lord Fauntleroy, also known as , is a Japanese anime series produced by Nippon Animation in 1988 and was broadcast on the World Masterpiece Theater.

It is an animation staple that showcased each year an animated version of a different classical book or story. The series is based on Frances Hodgson Burnett's 1886 book, Little Lord Fauntleroy.

In the Philippines, this work was aired by ABS-CBN in the early 1990s (with some rebroadcasts at the 21st century) under the title of Cedie, Ang Munting Prinsipe, with the spin-off live-action film of the same title by Star Cinema. The film adaptation of Little Lord Fauntleroy starred former child actor Tom Taus Jr. as the eponymous character.

In the United Kingdom, the series premiered as an English dub which aired on ITV between 1995 and 1998.

Outline
This work is a home drama which depicts the process of a grumpy grandfather and surroundings of a noble family moved by his grandson and becoming mild. It is also a feature that many animal characters have appeared.

The story is divided into two stages : the first stage is episodes in New York, and the second stage is episodes in the United Kingdom.

In "The World Masterpiece Theater" series, a boy became the main character for the first time in eight years since "the Adventures of Tom Sawyer". Since this work, a work with a boy as the main character appeared in a relatively short span.

Plot
The story concerns an American boy named Cedric Errol (more fondly known as "Ceddie"), who at an early age finds that he is the sole heir to a British earldom and leaves New York City to take up residence in his ancestral castle. After some initial resistance, he is joined by his middle-class mother (whom Cedie calls "Dearest"), widow of heir James Errol.

His grandfather, the Earl of Dorincourt, intends to teach the boy to become an aristocrat, but Cedie inadvertently teaches his grandfather compassion and social justice, and the artless simplicity and motherly love of Dearest warms the old man's heart.

Characters

Main characters
 Cedric Errol (Ceddie) (voiced by Ai Orikasa): The main character of this anime. An innocent and warm-hearted 7-year-old boy who likes baseball and is good at playing the flute.
 James Errol (voiced by Shinji Ogawa): The father of Cedie. A kind, and respected man. A reporter of a newspaper company. Born in an earl family of the United Kingdom. He married with a US citizen: Annie despite of his family's opposition, and was estranged from his family as a result. Due to fatigue from over work, he died of a heart attack at the end of episode 5.
 Annie Errol (Mrs. Errol) (voiced by Tomoko Munakata): The mother of Cedie. A pretty, young, and kind-hearted woman.
 Earl Dorincourt (voiced by Takeshi Watabe): The grandfather of Cedie. A grumpy, bitter, and selfish old man at first.

Episodes in New York
 Alec (voiced by Yuzuru Fujimoto): The stubborn chief editor of the Morning Journal where James is on work.
 Silas Hobbes (voiced by Toshiya Ueda): An aged man who runs a greengrocer who initially despises aristocrats.
 Ms. Eliza (voiced by Miharu Yokota): A teacher at the school Ceddie attends.
 Eric (voiced by Kazue Ikura): A "best friend" and classmate of Ceddie.
 Mickey (voiced by Yūko Mita): A friend and classmate of Ceddie.
 Roy (voiced by Minami Takayama): A friend and classmate of Ceddie.
 Catherine (voiced by Rei Sakuma): A friend and classmate of Ceddie.
 Sara (voiced by Rihoko Yoshida): Catherine's mother.

Episodes in the United Kingdom
 Mrs. Melon (voiced by Shō Saitō): The chief maid of the Dorincourt family, who cares for Ceddie.
 Jane Short (voiced by Eiko Yamada): A maid of Cedie, who becomes one of his close friends.
 Wilkins (voiced by Bin Shimada): The keeper of the territory of Earl Drincourt and the keeper of the stables.
 Cocky/Colleen (voiced by Mitsuko Horie): An orphaned girl of 5 years, raised under her grandmother that lives in Court Lodge near the Dorincourt family, which eventually becomes Ceddie's best friend. Mrs. Errol also lives there at some Point.
 Brigette (voiced by Naoko Matsui): Cedie's distant cousin. Initially she despised Cedie, but by an incident caused by her, she become reconciled with Cedie.
 Harris (voiced by Yoshiko Sakakibara): The mother of Bridget and is malicious against Cedie.
 Guard : An unnamed member of the palace guards who protects the queen and freezes, Cedric just called him a doll, and he also doesn't speak.
 Mr. Jefferson (voiced by Kōichi Kitamura): The butler of the Dorincourt castle, and who constantly looks after the Earl which always annoyes him.
 Kathy/Katy (voiced by Miyako Shima): Cocky/Coline's grandmother.
 Peter (voiced by Teiyū Ichiryūsai): A boy a little older than Ceddie that works in the fields that befriends him.

Animal characters
 Dougal: Cedie's pet dog, and a dog of the Dorincourt family.
 Little Prince: A white horse presented for Cedie.
 Searim: Earl Dorincourt's horse.
 Lyla: Cocky's pet cat.

Staff
 Director: Kōzō Kusuba
 Scenario: Fumio Ishimori
 Character design: Michiyo Sakurai
 Music: Kōichi Morita
 Sound director: Etsuji Yamada
 Animation director: Michiyo Sakurai, Hideaki Shimada, Hidemi Maeda, Megumi Kagawa, Toshiki Yamazaki, Hisatoshi Motoki, Yūko Fujii
 Art director: Nobuaki Numai
 Producer: Shigeo Endō, Junzō Nakajima (Nippon Animation), Jirō Komaki (Fuji Television)
 Planning: Shōji Satō (Nippon Animation), Taihei Ishikawa (Fuji Television)
 Production management: Mitsuru Takakuwa, Junzō Nakajima (Nippon Animation)
 Production desk: Shun'ichi Kosao (Nippon Animation)

Theme songs
 Opening theme: 
 Song by: Hikaru Nishida
 Lyrics by: Michio Yamagami
 Composition by: Kōichi Morita
 Arrangement by: Kazuo Ōtani
 Ending theme: 
 Song by: Hikaru Nishida
 Lyrics by: Michio Yamagami
 Composition by: Kōichi Morita
 Arrangement by: Kazuo Ōtani
 Insertion song: 
 Song by: Ai Orikasa
 Lyrics by: Akira Itō
 Composition by: Kōichi Morita
 Arrangement by: Kazuo Ōtani

Hikaru Nishida who sang theme songs of this work, did not appear as a cast (dubbing voice) in the main story, but acted Cedie in the musical of this work.

Until this work, singers of theme songs appeared in the main story in some way, such as casts and musicals. However, since the successor "The Adventures of Peter Pan", singers of theme songs do not always appear in the main story (e.g. Yukiko Iwai in "The Adventures of Peter Pan" did not act any casts).

Trivia
 Shōkōshi Cedie was a runaway hit in the Philippines, as was Hodgson-Burnett's other anime-adapted work, Princess Sarah. Both series were adapted into feature-length, live-action films by Star Cinema. The film adaptation of Little Lord Fauntleroy stars former child actor Tom Taus Jr. as the eponymous character.
 A video game based on the series was made for the Nintendo Family Computer and was released 24 December 1988.
 In one of the episodes, Cedie is seen reading a National Geographic magazine, which featured  British aristocrats.

Discourse of casts
Ai Orikasa who made her debut with this work, said as follows:

緒方賢一さんと子供ミュージカルの舞台で出会ってなければ、声優のお仕事をしていなかった‥『小公子セディ』主役デビューなんてラッキーなことも‥振り返ると人々の作って下さった流れに乗っかっての今である。
その是非は問わずに前に進もう！若人のエネルギーで今また一つ支流が生まれそう^.^
(in Ai Orikawa's twitter, 9 September 2016)

In other words, she thanks the debut with "Little Lord Fauntleroy".

See also
 Romeo's Blue Skies
 Same as this work, Ai Orikasa is the main actor, and Kōzō Kusuba is the director. It was broadcast in 1995.
 Moero! Top Striker
 A work in which Ai Orikasa and Kazue Ikura co-star, a dog character appears, and harsh characters gradually becomes milder, showing similarities to this work. Starring Kazue Ikura, it broadcast in 1991.

References

External links 
 
 Nippon Animation - the outline of "the Little Lord Fauntleroy"
  小公子セディ—official page of the series (Japanese)
 
  Little Prince Cedie (1988)—information on the series at Animanga.com
 Anoboy

1988 anime television series debuts
Drama anime and manga
Animated television series about children
Animated television series about families
Television series set in the 1880s
Television shows set in England
Television shows set in New York City
World Masterpiece Theater series